"Pawnee Rangers" is the fourth episode of the fourth season of the NBC sitcom Parks and Recreation. Unlike many episodes during the fourth season that focus on Leslie's campaign for city council, this episode hardly even mentions it. "Pawnee Rangers" garnered 3.99 million viewers, a decrease in viewers from the previous episode. The episode was written by Alan Yang and was directed by Charles McDougall.

Plot
Ron Swanson (Nick Offerman) is the leader of a Boy Scout-like group called the Pawnee Rangers, with Andy Dwyer (Chris Pratt) as his assistant. A girl had previously not been allowed to join the Rangers because it is for boys only, so Leslie Knope (Amy Poehler) created the girls-only Pawnee Goddesses, with Ann Perkins (Rashida Jones) and April Ludgate (Aubrey Plaza) as her assistants. Leslie is determined to prove that her group is better to avenge the past rejection, so she decides to arrange a weekend camping trip for the Goddesses at the same camping ground as the Rangers. Meanwhile, after noticing that Ben Wyatt (Adam Scott) is feeling down, Donna Meagle (Retta) and Tom Haverford (Aziz Ansari) invite him on their annual "Treat Yo Self" trip, where they spend a day spending money extravagantly on things they don't need. Jerry Gergich is left alone in the office, so Chris (Rob Lowe) gives him the day off; Jerry invites Chris to have lunch with him and his daughter Millicent "Milly" Gergich (Sarah Wright), and Chris agrees when he sees that Milly is very attractive.

The Pawnee Rangers become jealous of the Pawnee Goddesses, who appear to be having a lot more fun on the trip as they have puppies, pillow fights, and candy, while the Rangers are only given beans and told to build a meager shelter. Leslie is glad her efforts to make the boys jealous worked but the Goddesses, after a public forum, decide to let the Rangers join them if they want to. Every Ranger - including Andy - defects to the Goddesses, making Leslie feel sorry when she spots Ron sitting at a campfire all alone. She apologizes for being so competitive, and Ron laments that children no longer want to learn tough survival skills, admitting Leslie has the better group. To make Ron feel better, Leslie takes out an ad in the paper for a new group of self-reliant survivalists called "The Swansons", and Ron is surprised to find a group of eager children (girls and boys) in his office ready to join.

Ben is unable to enjoy himself with Tom and Donna, but opens up after Tom and Donna encourage him to splurge on a Batman costume. He starts to cry and tells them that he recently broke up with a woman, without telling them the woman is Leslie. Tom tells Ben to "treat yourself to a good cry". 

Chris hits it off with Milly during lunch and tells Jerry that he plans on asking her out on a date and insists on being open with Jerry about their activities. Things take an awkward turn the next day when Chris tells Jerry that the date went well and that Milly spent the night at his house afterwards.

Reception
The episode received mixed to positive reviews. Matt Fowler of IGN claimed that "it was a fun story because we got to see people shift around and find out the places they felt the most comfortable." Steve Heisler of The AV Club gave "Pawnee Rangers" a B−, but praised Nick Offerman's performance, saying "there is no more fun character on TV today than Ron Swanson—and though I didn’t love 'Pawnee Rangers,' I still believe that wholeheartedly."

References

External links
 

2011 American television episodes
Parks and Recreation (season 4) episodes
Scouting in popular culture